Gülbin Hız (born June 11, 1994) is a Turkish women's football midfielder, who plays in the Women's Super League for ALG Spor. She was part of the Turkey girls' national U-17, Turkey women's national U-19, and is a member of the Turkey women's national team.

Playing career

Club

Gülbin Hız obtained her license on June 10, 2008. She entered Gölcükspor at her hometown, where she played three seasons from 2008 to 2009 on. She debuted in the Turkish Women's First League with her team's promotion in the 2010–11 season. She capped 41 times and scored 24 goals with Gölcükspor, where she served also as the team captain. Then, Hız transferred to Derince Belediyespor, a team in the Second League. After one season, she again enjoyed the promotion of her new team to the First League. After playing two seasons, appearing in 25 games and netting 15 goals, she signed for the league-champion Konak Belediyespor at the end of the 2012–13 season.

She debuted at the 2013–14 UEFA Women's Champions League playing in six of the the total seven matches until the end of the Round 16.

After two seasons with Konak Belediyespor, where she netted five goals in 26 games, Gülbin Hız transferred to Trabzon İdmanocağı for the 2015–16 season.

After two seasons, Hız transferred to the Izmir-base club Konak Belediyespor. She took part in three matches of the 2017–18 UEFA Women's Champions League qualifying round in Tbilisi, Georgia.

After one season with Konak Belediyespor, she moved to Gazianyep to join the recently promoted club ALG Spor.  She played at the |2020–21 UEFA Women's Champions League qualifying round against the Albanian team KFF Vllaznia Shkodër in Shkodër, Albania on 3 November 2020, and scored one goal in the penalty shoot-out.

On 22 March 2021, Hız moved to Ukraine and joined WFC Zhytlobud-2 Kharkiv to play in the Ukrainian Women's League.

For the 2021-22 Women's Super League season, she returned to her former club ALG Spor. She enjoyed the 2021-22 Women's Super League champion title of her team. On 18 August 2022, she played in the 2022–23 UEFA Women's Champions League.

International
Turkey girls' U-17
Gülbin Hız was admitted to the Turkey women's U-17 team debuting in the friendly match against the Bulgarian girls on June 26, 2009. She capped 16 times and scored 8 goals with the Turkey national girls' U-17 team.

Turkey women's U-19
Around the same time, she was called up to the Turkey women's U-19 team, and played for the first time in the friendly match against Moldova on August 15, 2009. She capped 18 times in total for the Turkey junior women's team.

Turkey women's
Hız became member of the Turkey women's team, appearing for the first time in the friendly match against Portugal on August 23, 2011. She played at the UEFA Women's Euro 2013 qualifying – Group 2 match against the women from Kazakhstan on September 22, 2011. End 2012, she was called up again to the women's national team.

Career statistics

Honours 
 Turkish Women's First League
 Konak Belediyespor
 Winners (2): 2013–14, 2014–15
 Third places (1): 2017–18

 Trabzon İdmanocağı
 Third places (1): 2015–16

 ALG Spor
 Winners (2): 2019–20,  2021-22
 Runners-up (1): 2018–19
 Third places (1): 2020–21

References

External links
 

1994 births
Living people
People from Gölcük
Turkish women's footballers
Women's association football midfielders
Gölcükspor players
Derince Belediyespor women's players
Konak Belediyespor players
Trabzon İdmanocağı women's players
ALG Spor players
WFC Zhytlobud-2 Kharkiv players
Turkish Women's Football Super League players
Turkey women's international footballers
Turkish expatriate women's footballers
Turkish expatriate sportspeople in Ukraine
Expatriate women's footballers in Ukraine